Xavier Riddle and the Secret Museum is an animated children's television series that premiered on November 11, 2019, on PBS Kids.  The series is  based on the children's book series written by Brad Meltzer, named Ordinary People Change the World. The series involves Xavier Riddle with his sister Yadina, and their friends Brad and Berby, at the Secret Museum, and help from historical heroes, who are depicted in the series as children.

Premise 
The series follows the adventures of Xavier Riddle, his sister Yadina Riddle (alongside her stuffed turtle Dr. Zoom) and their friend Brad.  In each episode, a problem or difficulty is encountered.  They go to the Secret Museum to time travel to the past to observe, interact, and learn from the historical heroes.  They then return to the present and use their experience to solve the problem.

Characters

Main
 Xavier Riddle (voiced by Aidan Vissers) - The titular character and the leader of his group with his sister Yadina and their friend Brad. He appears to be an excitable kid who is eager to go back in time and meet various historical figures. He is described as a kid who loves everything (especially art and basketball), but lives for adventures.
 Yadina Riddle (voiced by Zoe Hatz) - Xavier's younger sister. She seems to be eager to explore the secret museum and learn about various historical figures. She carries a stuffed turtle around with her named Dr. Zoom. She is quite talented, whether it be with books or with balls. Although Yadina is very extroverted (not a wallflower at all), she is only six years old. This means that she can be very honest with just about anyone, and sometimes even blunt. For example, Yadina dislikes meanness of any kind, and if anyone is not being friendly to another, Yadina will let them know exactly what she thinks of their behavior. When faced with conflict, Yadina is an expert at making others understand a situation from someone else's perspective, which ultimately requires empathy, self-awareness, and self-regulation. She also has a habit of making bad puns, which she fruitlessly tries to explain to both her brother Xavier and her buddy Brad.
 Brad Scott Meltzer (voiced by Wyatt White) - Xavier's best friend. He tends to be the most nervous and neurotic of Xavier's group and suffers from several allergies. He is sometimes hesitant to go on adventures since travelling back in time makes him dizzy. Brad is quite partial to butterflies, as well as action heroes and is a relatively good artist who enjoys drawing comic book stories. He is described as having "delusions of averageness", and is apprehensive over everything. His friends, Xavier and Yadina, encourage him to live a little and to try new things. He suffers from impostor syndrome. Brad is Jewish, as revealed in the episode I am Tomioka Tessai, when he shows his friends a dreidel. His last name is only revealed on the website. He is an avatar of the author of the book series Brad Meltzer, whom he also resembles.

Supporting
 Berby, a small, egg-shaped flying robot who resides at the Secret Museum and functions as part of the time machine by transporting Xavier, Yadina, Dr. Zoom, and Brad back and forth in time. Berby communicates by making robotic beeping sounds, and is good friends with the kids and Dr. Zoom. She also functions as the museum's curator, ensuring all of the exhibits are taken care of and in the right places. Berby also appears in all the shorts after all of the episodes, either winning another "race around the world" against Xavier, playing hide & seek with Dr. Zoom & Yadina, co-starring with Brad in one of his "Bradman" comics, or going on random travels with Dr. Zoom. It is revealed in "I Am Madam President" that Berby is a female robot.

Production 
Brad Meltzer wrote the book Ordinary People Change the World and began a series based on the book named the Ordinary People series in 2014 with I Am Abraham Lincoln, I Am Amelia Earhart, I Am Rosa Parks, and I Am Albert Einstein.

The series is produced by 9 Story Media Group's animation division, Brown Bag Films. 9 Story's Chief Creative Officer Angela Santomero states that Xavier Riddle lets kids know they have "the curiosity and adventurous spirit to change the world". Meltzer added to that statement: "When my own kids watch this series, I get to see them realize that there’s extraordinary within the ordinary."

Episodes
Each episode of Xavier Riddle and the Secret Museum runs for half an hour. They consist of two 11-minute stories based on famous historical heroes around the world in the past. However, airings on streaming services such as Globoplay in Brazil split the episodes into segments, with each 11-minute story isolated. There may be an interstitial segment between the two main stories, in which Berby, and either Xavier, Yadina, Brad, or Dr. Zoom, are shown doing something fun together.

Season 1 (2019-22)

Shorts (2022) 
These shorts were released exclusively on the PBS Kids video app.

Xavier Riddle and the Secret Movie: I Am Madam President
A TV special titled Xavier Riddle and the Secret Movie: I Am Madam President aired on March 16, 2020. In the special, Yadina, who dreams of becoming president one day, realizes all the presidents were men. She questions if she can still be president, even though it is something no girl has done yet. The trio visit the Secret Museum, where a five-part star is shown to them. They travel to different periods in time, where they meet women who are attempting to do something that has never been done before. Yadina learns from them on what is needed to do something that has never been done before, as she attempts to complete the star. She meets Jackie Joyner-Kersee, Amelia Earhart, Junko Tabei, Sally Ride and herself as an adult. Amelia Earhart is the only historical figure to be featured in this movie and an episode.

Broadcast 
The series premiered on PBS Kids in United States on November 12, 2019. It premiered on TVOKids in Canada on December 10, 2019. It airs on Super3, a Catalan-language children's channel in Spain.

Reception

Critical response
Joyce Slaton of Common Sense Media gave Xavier Riddle and the Secret Museum a mixed review. She stated that "the show makes many historical inaccuracies, which makes it odd for a TV show that wants to make history come back alive for kids." She also stated that "the show's tendency to play too fast and loose with the historical facts is confusing, and that 'Go for it!' is an unlikely motto for Amelia Earhart, who disappeared in 1937 and didn't complete her solo Atlantic flight as a grade school student, as Xavier depicts." George Washington Carver did have a secret garden as a child, in which he learned important lessons that impacted his career in botany. But, as Slaton states, "it's a real stretch to imagine him having to defend plants from renegade soccer players in 19th century Missouri," and that "the show seems to overlook his importance as an activist for ex-slaves and champion of sustainable agriculture, instead boiling his messages down to 'take care of plants and you'll take care of the earth.'"

Awards and nominations

Notes

References

Attribution:

External links 

 Official website
 
Xavier Riddle and the Secret Museum at TVOKids

2010s American children's television series
2020s American children's television series
2010s American animated television series
2020s American animated television series
2010s Canadian children's television series
2020s Canadian children's television series
2010s Canadian animated television series
2020s Canadian animated television series
2019 American television series debuts
2019 Canadian television series debuts
2022 American television series endings
2022 Canadian television series endings
American flash animated television series
American children's animated adventure television series
American children's animated education television series
American television shows based on children's books
Canadian flash animated television series
Canadian children's animated adventure television series
Canadian children's animated education television series
Canadian television shows based on children's books
English-language television shows
PBS original programming
PBS Kids shows
Animation based on real people
Animated television series about children
Animated television series about siblings
Museums in popular culture
Television series by 9 Story Media Group
Television series by Brown Bag Films
Hispanic and Latino American television
Jewish television